Kininmonth is a surname. Notable people with the surname include:

Alexander Kininmonth (disambiguation)
Caroline Kininmonth (1907–1978), British artist
Peter Kininmonth, Scottish international rugby union player, who played for Scotland and the Lions
William Kininmonth (architect) (1904–1988), Scottish architect whose work mixed a modern style with Scottish vernacular
William Kininmonth (meteorologist), retired Australian meteorologist and opponent of anthropogenic global warming theory